The Asociación Deportiva Siquirres is a Costa Rican sports club, mostly known for its football team which currently plays in the Costa Rican Third Division.

The club is located in Siquirres, Limón Province, and play their home games at the Finca Siquirres.

History
Founded only in 2010, Siquirreña won promotion to the Liga Ascenso in summer 2013 after beating Jicaral in a promotion playoff final. They had lost that final a year earlier against Finca Austria de Nosara.

References

External links
Official website 
:es:ADF Siquirreña 

Saprissa
Association football clubs established in 2010
2010 establishments in Costa Rica